Holsbeek is a municipality located in the Belgian province of Flemish Brabant. On January 1, 2006, Holsbeek had a total population of 9,205. The total area is 38.50 km2 which gives a population density of 239 inhabitants per km2.

The best known historical landmark of the municipality is the medieval castle of Horst.

References

External links
 
 Gazetteer Entry

Municipalities of Flemish Brabant